The 1937 Oklahoma Sooners football team represented the University of Oklahoma in the 1937 college football season. In their first year under head coach Tom Stidham, the Sooners compiled a 5–2–2 record (3–1–1 against conference opponents), finished in second place in the Big Six Conference, and outscored their opponents by a combined total of 98 to 39.

End Pete Smith received All-America honors in 1937, and four Sooners received all-conference honors: Smith, back Jack Baer, center Mickey Parks, and end Waddy Young.

Schedule

Media
This was the first season that all Sooner football games were radio broadcast over the air. The games were carried by WKY and Walter Cronkite was the announcer.

NFL Draft
The following players were drafted into the National Football League following the season.

References

Oklahoma
Oklahoma Sooners football seasons
Oklahoma Sooners football